Javier May Rodríguez (born 5 May 1966) is a Mexican politician who serves as the General Director of the National Tourism Development Fund. He previously served as the Secretary of Welfare, as a senator and deputy for Tabasco, and as the mayor of Comalcalco.

References

External links
 Senator profile at Legislative Information System

Living people
1966 births
21st-century Mexican politicians
Morena (political party) politicians
Cabinet of Andrés Manuel López Obrador
Politicians from Tabasco
Members of the Senate of the Republic (Mexico)
Members of the Congress of Tabasco
Municipal presidents in Tabasco
Mexican Secretaries of Social Development